Chris Nikic (born 1999) is an American amateur triathlete. In 2020, at age 21, he became the first person with Down syndrome to finish an Ironman triathlon. For this accomplishment, Nikic was awarded the Jimmy V Award for Perseverance as part of the 2021 ESPY Awards. Additionally, he won the ESPY for Best Athlete with a Disability in Men's Sports.

Ironman Triathlon

Training 
Nikic trained with Dan Grieb, who has completed 16 Ironman races, for four to eight hours each day for around one year. He began exercising in 2017 with a single pushup and aimed to improve his performance 1% each day.''I have to work hard and give my best every day. If I do an Ironman and become a pro-speaker I will have a chance to get my dream.'' Chris Nikic

Nikic is also training for the 2022 Special Olympics USA Games.

2020 Ironman Florida 
Nikic completed the Ironman Florida triathlon in 16 hours 46 minutes 9 seconds, swimming , cycling , and then running a marathon . This earned him recognition from Guinness World Records. His time was 14 minutes faster than the cut-off time for qualification. "We don't make any accommodations for anyone around the core elements of racing." --Andrew Messick, CEO of Ironman Group.

Early life 
Nikic grew up in Florida. He had open-heart surgery at five months old, and was not able to walk well until four years old or eat solid food until age five.

References 

American male triathletes
Living people
1999 births
Sportspeople from Florida
Sportspeople with Down syndrome